Roar is a Norwegian masculine given name derived by the Old Norse name Hróðgeirr, and equivalent of the Norman-French name Roger. Notable people with the name include:

Roar Adler (1915–2007), Norwegian newspaper manager
Roar Berthelsen (1934–1990), Norwegian long jumper
Roar Christensen (born 1971), Norwegian football midfielder
Roar Flåthen (born 1950), Norwegian trade unionist and politician
Roar Grønvold (born 1946), Norwegian speed skater and Olympic medalist
Roar Hagen (born 1954), Norwegian illustrator
Roar Hagen (footballer) (born 1971), Norwegian football goalkeeper
Roar Hauglid (1910–2001), Norwegian art historian and publicist
Roar Hoff (born 1965), Norwegian shot putter
Roar Johansen (footballer) (born 1935), Norwegian footballer
Roar Johansen (football coach) (born 1968), Norwegian football coach
Roar Kjernstad (born 1975), Norwegian figurative painter
Roar Ljøkelsøy (born 1976), Norwegian ski jumper
Roar Øfstedal, Norwegian ice hockey player
Roar Pedersen (1927–1989), Norwegian ice hockey player
Roar Stokke (born 1959), Norwegian football player, coach and sports commentator
Roar Strand (born 1970), Norwegian football player
Roar Uthaug (born 1973), Norwegian film director

Norwegian masculine given names